Herminio "Harry" Lopez Roque Jr. (born October 21, 1966) is a Filipino lawyer, politician, and former law professor. He served as the presidential spokesperson of President Rodrigo Duterte from 2017 to 2018 and from 2020 to 2021. He was the party-list representative of KABAYAN from 2016 to 2017.

Roque taught constitutional law and public international law for 15 years at the University of the Philippines College of Law. In his law practice, he notably represented the victims of the Maguindanao massacre and the family of Jennifer Laude, a trans woman killed by a U.S. Marine.

He was requested by President Rodrigo Duterte to be his presidential spokesperson, and on October 27, 2017, Roque was officially appointed, replacing Ernesto Abella. On November 22, 2017, he was designated presidential adviser for human rights concurrent with being the presidential spokesperson.

Roque is also a member of the Advisory Council of the Asian Society of International Law (AsianSIL) and was president of AsianSIL from 2018 to 2019.

Education
Roque received his Bachelor of Arts (economics and political science) from the University of Michigan at Ann Arbor (1986), Bachelor of Laws from University of the Philippines (1990) and Master of Laws with merits from the London School of Economics (1996).

Legal career
Through the advocacy group Center for International Law (Centerlaw), of which he was one of the founders, Roque and his team represented victims of the 2009 Ampatuan massacre; the Malaya Lolas, victims of systematic rape and abuse by the Japanese Imperial Army; the family of the killed transgender Jennifer Laude; and the family of the murdered environmental advocate and media man Gerry Ortega of Palawan.

Roque has argued before the Supreme Court on several occasions. On the Supreme Court website, the retired Supreme Court Justice Antonio Eduardo B. Nachura identifies him "as among those who have impressed him when they had argued before the Supreme Court".
 
Among the cases that he argued before the high court were assailing Presidential Proclamation 1017 and General Order No. 5, placing the country under a State of Emergency partially unconstitutional for infringing on the constitutionally protected rights of free speech, peaceful assembly and freedom of the press. He is also among the five counsels allowed to argue specific issues raised against the Cybercrime Law. On another occasion, he represented the Integrated Bar of the Philippines in arguing that local government officials cannot deny applications for rally permits except on grounds that the conduct of the same will result in a clear and present danger to the state.

He also helped secure for Boracay Foundation a Temporary Environmental Protection Order (TEPO) to stop the reclamation of 42 hectares of land in Caticlan due to the absence of studies and guarantees that it would not damage Boracay Island. Roque won the first ever granted petition for the writ of Amparo in favor of a journalist, as well as another petition for Amparo - the second application for writ of Amparo where the Court of Appeals issued protective orders.

He mentored and coached some of the UP College of Law moot teams that won in various competitions, including the 2015 Oxford Price Moot Court Competition in Oxford, UK, where the team beat 91 others. He also mentored the team that won prizes in the Red Cross International Humanitarian Law Moot Competition held in Hong Kong on March 18, 2015, and the team that won the championship on March 11–12, 2005. In March 2012, Team Philippines made it to the semi-finals of the 2012 Jessup International Law Moot Court competition in Washington, D.C.

Roque was nominated by the Philippine government to the International Law Commission in 2021. As part of his bid he proposed an international treaty on equal COVID-19 vaccine access and the recognition of the permanent presence of states which could possibly sink below sea level due to global warming. The Free Legal Assistance Group, the executive committee of his alma mater University of the Philippines Diliman, and the UP Integrated High School expressed opposition to his nomination for his role as part of President Rodrigo Duterte's administration. He failed to garner enough votes to win one of the eight seats in contention.

Political career

Congressman 
After becoming a congressman, Roque resigned as a member of the Center for International Law (Centerlaw). He was the principal author of the Universal Health Coverage Bill, which was passed on the third and final reading by the House of Representatives on September 6, 2017. Roque defended the bill during the plenary debates.

Roque was also one of three representatives who endorsed the impeachment case against the former Comelec chairman, Andres Bautista.

Presidential spokesperson 

Roque assumed the role of President Duterte's presidential spokesperson on November 6, 2017. According to Duterte, Roque would be fit for the role because like him he has a "slightly naughty speaking style". Roque said that Duterte was looking for someone who could understand the remarks of the President adding that the nature of his job required him to relay President Rodrigo Duterte's positions.

2019 Senate elections 

On October 5, 2018, Roque was reported to be interested to vie for a Senate seat in the 2019 Elections. Duterte said that Roque has no chance to win saying that he has no support from the military will just give him another role. On October 9, Roque was reported to have threatened to resign from his post after he was kept in the dark about Duterte's visit to a hospital on October 3. He eventually resigned on October 15, expressing his plans to run for a seat at the House of Representatives, under Luntiang Pilipinas Party. Roque later made his political plans official after filing his Certificate of Candidacy for Senator of the republic on October 17.

On February 1, 2019, Roque dropped out of the 2019 Senatorial race, citing a medical condition.

Return as the presidential spokesperson 
In April 2020, Roque returned to his role as Duterte's presidential spokesperson, replacing Salvador Panelo, who replaced him in 2018.

On April 13, 2020, Roque assumed the role of spokesperson for the Inter-Agency Task Force for the Management of Emerging Infectious Diseases, amid the COVID-19 pandemic replacing Karlo Nograles.

2022 Senate elections
Roque filed his certificate of candidacy for the 2022 Senate election on November 15, 2021, which automatically meant that he has resigned from his position as presidential and IATF spokesperson. He ran under the People's Reform Party, substituting the candidacy of Paolo Mario Martelino. He said that he had promise to bid for a seat in the Senate if Sara Duterte decides to run for a national position. He also "found resolve to run" after a protest was staged in New York City against his bid to get elected to the International Law Commission of the United Nations to prevent the election of allies of what he deems as extremist groups. Roque lost in the Senate elections, finishing at 17th in a race to fill 12 seats.

Personal life 
Roque is a Protestant. He is married to Mylah Reyes, a former television reporter, with whom he has two children.

References

|-



1966 births
Living people
20th-century Filipino lawyers
Party-list members of the House of Representatives of the Philippines
University of the Philippines alumni
Presidential spokespersons (Philippines)
Duterte administration cabinet members
University of Michigan College of Literature, Science, and the Arts alumni
Alumni of the London School of Economics
Academic staff of the University of the Philippines
Filipino Protestants
21st-century Filipino lawyers